Zhuravlyi is a rural locality (a station) in Kasatkinsky Selsoviet of Arkharinsky District, Amur Oblast, Russia. The population was 2 in 2018.

Geography 
Zhuravli is located on Trans-Siberian Railway, 16 km northwest of Arkhara (the district's administrative centre) by road. Krasnaya Gorka is the nearest rural locality.

References 

Rural localities in Arkharinsky District